Ross Weatherstone (born 16 May 1981) is a former English professional footballer who played in the Football League for Oxford United and Boston United. He was most recently joint manager of Hartley Wintney.

Playing career
Weatherstone started his career at Oxford United, making his debut live on Sky TV against Reading. His brother Simon was also an Oxford player and they became the first brothers to play for Oxford United since Ron Atkinson and Graham Atkinson in a competitive fixture.

In February 2001 Weatherstone and his brother signed for Boston United. They helped Boston United win the Football Conference in 2002, earning promotion to the Football League, with Ross captained the side for a handful of games.

Weatherstone left Boston United and joined Nuneaton Borough for a short spell at the end of the 2002–03 season. At the start 2003–04 season he signed for Farnborough Town, before joining Stevenage Brough midway through the season.

He retired from the professional game in 2005 after multiple operations to his left lateral meniscus. He made a brief comeback in 2006 when he signed for Didcot Town, officially retiring from playing the game in 2007.

Coaching career
Having coached at Bracknell Town and Binfield, in May 2022 Weatherstone was appointed joint manager of Hartley Wintney alongside Ty Newton. The management duo resigned from their roles on 20 October 2022.

References

External links

1981 births
Living people
Sportspeople from Reading, Berkshire
Association football defenders
English footballers
Oxford United F.C. players
Chesterfield F.C. players
Boston United F.C. players
Nuneaton Borough F.C. players
Stevenage F.C. players
Farnborough F.C. players
Didcot Town F.C. players
English Football League players
Footballers from Berkshire
Hartley Wintney F.C. managers
Southern Football League managers